The following is a list of notable events and releases of the year 1931 in Norwegian music.

Events

Deaths

 January
 20 – Margrethe Munthe, teacher, children's writer, songwriter, and playwright (born 1860).

 May
 3 – Otto Winter-Hjelm, composer, known especially for his operas.musician, conductor, writer, composer, and music critic (born 1837).

Births

 January
 26 – Kaare Ørnung, pianist and music teacher (died 2013).

 June
 520 – Arne Nordheim, composer (died 2010).

 July
 29 – Kjell Karlsen, band leader, composer, arranger, jazz pianist and organist.

 December
 7 – Bjørg Lødøen, painter, graphic artist, and composer (died 2009).

See also
 1931 in Norway
 Music of Norway

References

 
Norwegian music
Norwegian
Music
1930s in Norwegian music